The blackmouth shiner (Notropis melanostomus) is a species of cyprini fish.

It is endemic to the United States. It is found in the Blackwater-Yellow river systems in Florida, Bay Minette Creek in Alabama, and the lower Pascagoula River system in Mississippi.

References 

 Robert Jay Goldstein, Rodney W. Harper, Richard Edwards: American Aquarium Fishes. Texas A&M University Press 2000, p. 106
 

Notropis
Fish described in 1989
Taxonomy articles created by Polbot